"Someone Else Calling You Baby" is a song co-written and recorded by American country music artist Luke Bryan. It was released in August 2010 as the third and final single from his 2009 album Doin' My Thing. The song became Bryan's second number one hit on the US Billboard Hot Country Songs chart in February 2011. Bryan wrote this song with Jeff Stevens.

Content
"Someone Else Calling You Baby" is a moderate uptempo tune mainly accompanied by electric guitar. In it, the male narrator sees his lover in someone else's truck and wonders if she has left him for someone else.

This song is set in the key of A major, with a tempo of approximately 115 beats per minute. Bryan's vocals range from C4 to F5.

Critical reception
In his review of the album, Michael Sudhalter of Country Standard Time viewed the song positively, saying that it could be a sequel to the relationship described in the album's first single, "Do I." Giving it four stars out of five, Bobby Peacock of Roughstock compared its theme to Rhett Akins' "That Ain't My Truck," and compared Bryan's vocals to those of John Anderson. The song received a "thumbs down" from Janet Goodman of Engine 145, also praising Bryan's vocals and the production but saying that the song's lyrics were in a "straightforward style with no twists."

Chart performance
"Someone Else Calling You Baby" debuted at number 52 on the Hot Country Songs chart dated for the week ending of August 14, 2010 and became Bryan's second number one hit on that chart after "Rain Is a Good Thing". It also debuted at number 100 on the Billboard Hot 100 chart for the week of November 13, 2010.

Year-end charts

Certifications

References

2010 singles
Luke Bryan songs
Songs written by Luke Bryan
Songs written by Jeff Stevens (singer)
Capitol Records Nashville singles
2009 songs